William Alfred Laver (21 August 1888 – 16 November 1922) was an Australian rules footballer who played with Carlton and Fitzroy in the Victorian Football League (VFL).

Notes

External links 

Bill Laver's profile at Blueseum

1888 births
1922 deaths
Australian rules footballers from Victoria (Australia)
Carlton Football Club players
Fitzroy Football Club players
North Melbourne Football Club (VFA) players
People from Castlemaine, Victoria